PQL, pql, or variation, may refer to:

 Trent Lott International Airport (FAA id: PQL; IATA airport code: PGL; ICAO airport code: KPQL), Pascagoula, Jackson County, Mississippi, USA
 The Porcupine's Quill (PQL) publishing company based in Erie, Ontario, Canada
 Project Quantum Leap, a fictional time travel project from the TV series Quantum Leap
 Process Query Language, a database query language
 Papyrus Query Language, a proprietary query language for databases on the Papyrus Platform

See also
 PQI (disambiguation)
 PQ1 (disambiguation)